Bestwood Pumping Station was a water pumping station operating in Nottinghamshire from 1874 until 1964.

History
Bestwood Pumping Station was built between 1871 and 1874 on land belonging to William Beauclerk, 10th Duke of St Albans.  It was commissioned by the Nottingham Water Company and designed by Thomas Hawksley. Several of the structures on site are listed including the pump house, lodges, landscaped ornamental cooling pond, several cast iron lamps and the boundary walls.

It was equipped with two 125 hp rotative beam engines built by Joseph Whitham and Son, Leeds. It pumped water through two 18 inch mains to Red Hill reservoir and one 18 inch main to the Papplewick reservoir.

It operated until 1964 when a new electric pump house was built. The steam engines were removed between 1968 and 1972.

Current use

The Venetian Gothic Revival style building can be clearly seen from the main A60 road. Its tower makes the building a local landmark.

The site was vacant and boarded-up until Healthworks Co bought it. Starting in 1997 there has been a £2m conversion of the pumping station to a restaurant and health club complex.

See also
Grade II* listed buildings in Nottinghamshire
Listed buildings in Bestwood St. Albans
Papplewick Pumping Station
Boughton Pumping Station

External links

See Bestwood Pumping Station on Google Street View
Lakeside restaurant and spa

References

Buildings and structures in Nottinghamshire
Preserved stationary steam engines
Infrastructure completed in 1874
Grade II* listed buildings in Nottinghamshire
Water supply and sanitation in England
Water supply pumping stations